South Carne is a hamlet west of Altarnun in Cornwall, England, United Kingdom.

References

Hamlets in Cornwall